Pavel Aleksandrovich Krylov (born 27 August 1986) is a former Russian professional footballer.

Club career
He made his debut for FC Shinnik Yaroslavl on 3 July 2004 in an Intertoto Cup game against FK Teplice. He also appeared in the return leg against Teplice.

External links
 
 

1986 births
Footballers from Moscow
Living people
Russian footballers
Association football defenders
FC Shinnik Yaroslavl players
FC Sheksna Cherepovets players